Rio Blanco County is a county located in the U.S. state of Colorado. As of the 2020 census, the population was 6,529. The county seat is Meeker. The name of the county is the Spanish name for the White River which runs through it.

History
Rio Blanco County was created on March 25, 1889, when it was split from Garfield County. The town of Meeker became the county seat. 

On May 17, 1973, Rio Blanco County became one of two counties in Colorado to have a peaceful nuclear explosion as a part of Operation Plowshare. There were three nearly simultaneous explosions targeted at fracking oil, all detonated as Project Rio Blanco. The other county is Garfield County under Project Rulison.

Geography

Adjacent counties
 Moffat County - north
 Routt County - northeast
 Garfield County - south
 Uintah County, Utah - west

Major Highways
  State Highway 13
  State Highway 64
  State Highway 139

National protected areas
Routt National Forest
White River National Forest
Flat Tops Wilderness

Scenic byways
Dinosaur Diamond Prehistoric Highway National Scenic Byway
Flat Tops Trail Scenic Byway

State parks and wildlife areas
 Colorow Mountain State Wildlife Area

Demographics

At the 2000 census there were 5,986 people, 2,306 households, and 1,646 families living in the county.  The population density was 2 people per square mile (1/km2).  There were 2,855 housing units at an average density of 1 per square mile (0/km2).  The racial makeup of the county was 95.01% White, 0.18% Black or African American, 0.77% Native American, 0.28% Asian, 2.02% from other races, and 1.74% from two or more races.  4.94% of the population were Hispanic or Latino of any race.
Of the 2,306 households 35.60% had children under the age of 18 living with them, 60.10% were married couples living together, 7.80% had a female householder with no husband present, and 28.60% were non-families. 24.80% of households were one person and 8.70% were one person aged 65 or older.  The average household size was 2.50 and the average family size was 2.98.

The age distribution was 26.50% under the age of 18, 9.20% from 18 to 24, 27.50% from 25 to 44, 25.60% from 45 to 64, and 11.20% 65 or older.  The median age was 38 years. For every 100 females there were 101.90 males.  For every 100 females age 18 and over, there were 101.60 males.

The median household income was $37,711 and the median family income was $44,425. Males had a median income of $38,125 versus $19,940 for females. The per capita income for the county was $17,344.  About 6.70% of families and 9.60% of the population were below the poverty line, including 11.60% of those under age 18 and 10.40% of those age 65 or over.

Politics
Rio Blanco is an overwhelmingly Republican county in Presidential elections. It was along with Clark County, Idaho and Kane County, Utah one of only three counties west of the Continental Divide to vote for Alf Landon over Franklin Delano Roosevelt in 1936. In that election Rio Blanco was Landon's strongest county in the eleven western states, marginally shading normal Republican “banner county” Kane. Since that time only two Democrats – Harry S. Truman in 1948 and Lyndon Johnson who narrowly carried the county in 1964 – have obtained over forty percent of the county's vote. In fact, since 1968 only one Democratic presidential candidate, Michael Dukakis in 1988, and him only very marginally, has topped thirty percent of Rio Blanco County's ballots.

In other statewide elections, Rio Blanco County also leans Republican, although it was carried by Democrat Roy Romer in 1990 – when he carried all but four counties statewide – and by Constitution Party candidate Tom Tancredo in 2010. Rio Blanco County was also carried by Democratic Senatorial candidate “Nighthorse” Campbell in 1992, although since then no Democratic candidate for this office has surpassed thirty percent since.

Communities

Towns
Meeker (county seat)
Rangely

Unincorporated communities
Buford
White River City

See also

 Outline of Colorado
 Index of Colorado-related articles
 National Register of Historic Places listings in Rio Blanco County, Colorado

References

External links

 Rio Blanco County Government website
 Colorado County Evolution by Don Stanwyck
 Colorado Historical Society

 
Colorado counties
1889 establishments in Colorado
Populated places established in 1889